Mill Creek Historic District is a national historic district located at Bunker Hill, Berkeley County, West Virginia. It encompasses nine contributing buildings, eight contributing sites, and three contributing objects that relate to an early industrial-commercial center in the county.  They include: the Mill Creek Bridge (c. 1914), Henry Sherrard Mill (c. 1790), Robert Daniels House (c. 1790), John Gray House, Henshaw Log House (c. 1820), "Springhill" (late 18th century), Henshaw Miller's House (c. 1780), "Springfield" (c. 1775), Holliday Mill Sites, Bunker Hill Cumberland Valley Railroad Bridge, Stephenson's Tavern, Morgan Park including two State markers and monument (1924) to Morgan Morgan, Elisha Boyd Mill Sites, Joel Ward Mill ruins, Bunker Hill Mill Complex, and Joel Ward House (c. 1750, burned 1988).

It was listed on the National Register of Historic Places in 1980.

References

External links

National Register of Historic Places in Berkeley County, West Virginia
Historic districts in Berkeley County, West Virginia
Greek Revival architecture in West Virginia
Houses in Berkeley County, West Virginia
Houses on the National Register of Historic Places in West Virginia
Commercial buildings on the National Register of Historic Places in West Virginia
Grinding mills on the National Register of Historic Places in West Virginia
Grinding mills in West Virginia
Historic districts on the National Register of Historic Places in West Virginia
1980 establishments in West Virginia